Taha Jabir Al-Alwani (طه جابر علواني), Ph.D. (1935 – March 4, 2016), was the President of Cordoba University in Ashburn, Virginia, United States. He also held the Imam Al-Shafi'i Chair in the Islamic Legal Theory at The Graduate School of Islamic and Social Sciences at Corboda University. Al-Alwani concentrated on the fields of Islamic legal theory, jurisprudence (fiqh), usul al-fiqh, Qur'anic sciences, and general Islamic thought.

Al-Alwani was founder and former chairman of the Fiqh Council of North America.

Biography
Born in 1935 in Iraq, Al-Alwani received his high school diploma from Al-Azhar in 1953 and received his bachelor's from the College of Shari’ah and Law at al-Azhar University in Cairo, Egypt in 1959.  He continued at the college and earned a master's degree in 1968 and a doctorate in Usul al-fiqh in 1973.

Following his undergraduate studies, Al-Alwani returned to Iraq and became a lieutenant in the Iraqi Military Reserves. He taught in the Military Academy of Iraq in Baghdad and also taught in the College of Islamic Studies where he was a professor for 6 years. While in Baghdad Al-Alwani studied with some of Iraq's most prominent figures including: Sheikh Amjad al-Zahawi, Sheikh Qasim Al-Qaysi, (Grand Mufty of Iraq),  Sheikh Mohammad Fu'ad Al-Aloosi, Sheikh Abdul 'Aziz Salem Al-Samerai, Sheikh Mohammed Al-Qazilchi. Al-Alwani led Jummah (Friday Prayers) in the famous Mosque of Hajja Haseebah Al-Pachatchi from 1953 until 1969. He was forced to leave Iraq in 1969 due to his opposition of the Ba'ath party.

He returned to Al-Azhar in Egypt where he earned his PhD. After his PhD graduation he taught for 10 years at the Imam Muhammad ibn Saud University in Riyadh, Saudi Arabia. Al-Alwani then decided to immigrate to the United States in 1983 where he settled down in Northern Virginia for 23 years.

There he studied the history of several religious groups, specifically Jewish history and focused his attention on Rabbi Yohanan ben Zakay, who established the famous Jewish school in Haifa and founded the jurisprudence for Jewish minorities across the globe. Al-Alwani learned many of his lessons on Muslim integration into American society from Rabbi Yohanan. Al-Alwani's open attitude towards education strengthened his benefit to the Islamic community in the United States.

During his time in the United States and in the Middle East, he worked extensively on interfaith projects. He has a vast network of scholars from different religions whom he still keeps up with as friends today. Al-Alwani held the first chair for an Islamic scholar in the Washington Theological Consortium.

Thought and ideology

His work reflected moderate positions in Islamic scholarship, including a monograph he wrote against punishing apostasy.

Personal life
Al-Alwani had 3 children, Zainab Alwani, Ruqaia Al-Alwani and Ahmed Alwani all of whom are active in their fathers methodology. He still plays an active role in his late wife's Mona Abul-Fadl work on Muslim's Women Studies and promotes her book, "Arab Regimes".

He founded a library and think-tank in Cairo named Zahra and Mona Rewaq. He is the main supporter of the Arab Association of Women and Civilization Studies which was established by Dr. Mona Abul-Fadl. He enjoys listening to maqaam Iraqi and classical Arabic music (especially Umm Kalthoom). Since he was a child, he has played the musical instrument 'Al-Qanoon' (similar to the piano). He speaks Arabic, English, Persian, and Turkish.

References

External links
Taha Jabir Alalwani's "Apostasy in Islam"

Sharia judges
20th-century Muslim scholars of Islam
Al-Azhar University alumni
Iraqi emigrants to the United States
Academic staff of Imam Muhammad ibn Saud Islamic University
People from Fallujah
American Islamic studies scholars
2016 deaths
1935 births
Iraqi expatriates in Egypt